Merandy González (born October 9, 1995) is a Dominican professional baseball pitcher who is a free agent. He has played in Major League Baseball (MLB) for the Miami Marlins.

Career

New York Mets
González was signed by the New York Mets as an international free agent in March 2013. He made his professional debut that season with the DSL Mets and spent the whole season there, going 4-1 with a 2.82 ERA in 44.2 innings pitched. He returned to the DSL in 2014 and pitched to a 3-4 record and 3.51 ERA in 14 games (13 starts). In 2015, he pitched for the GCL Mets and Kingsport Mets where he compiled a 4-3 record and 2.57 ERA in 66.2 innings pitched, and in 2016 he played with the Brooklyn Cyclones where he posted a 6-3 record, 2.87 ERA, and 1.33 WHIP in 14 starts. He began 2017 with the Columbia Fireflies and was promoted to the St. Lucie Mets in June.

Miami Marlins
On July 28, 2017 he was traded by the Mets along with Ricardo Cespedes for A. J. Ramos. Miami assigned him to the Jupiter Hammerheads and he finished the season there. In 22 games (20 starts) between Columbia, St. Lucie, and Jupiter, he was 13-3 with a 1.66 ERA, 0.97 WHIP, and a .212 batting average against. The Marlins added him to their 40-man roster after the season. He began 2018 with the Jacksonville Jumbo Shrimp.

González made his Major League debut on April 19, 2018.

San Francisco Giants
On March 2, 2019, Gonzalez was claimed off waivers by the San Francisco Giants.

St. Louis Cardinals
On March 28, Gonzalez was claimed off waivers by the St. Louis Cardinals. He was designated for assignment on June 8. He became a free agent following the 2019 season.

Washington Nationals
On January 7, 2020, González signed a minor league contract with the Washington Nationals. González was released by the Nationals organization on May 29, 2020.

Tigres de Quintana Roo
On July 20, 2021, González signed with the Tigres de Quintana Roo of the Mexican League. He was released on August 5, 2021 after tossing 3 scoreless innings in 4 appearances for the team.

York Revolution
On March 1, 2022, González signed with the York Revolution of the Atlantic League of Professional Baseball. González struggled in 5 starts for York, recording a 1-4 record and 7.71 ERA with 18 strikeouts in 23.1 innings of work. He was released by the team on June 6.

References

External links

1995 births
Living people
People from Cotuí
Dominican Republic expatriate baseball players in the United States
Major League Baseball players from the Dominican Republic
Major League Baseball pitchers
Miami Marlins players
Dominican Summer League Mets players
Gulf Coast Mets players
Kingsport Mets players
Brooklyn Cyclones players
Columbia Fireflies players
St. Lucie Mets players
Jupiter Hammerheads players
Jacksonville Jumbo Shrimp players
Gulf Coast Cardinals players
Palm Beach Cardinals players
Springfield Cardinals players
Toros del Este players
Tigres de Quintana Roo players
Dominican Republic expatriate baseball players in Mexico